Muthireddigudem is a village in Yadadri Bhuvanagiri district. It falls under Bhongir mandal.

References

Villages in Yadadri Bhuvanagiri district